The Hertfordshire Rugby Football Union is the governing body for the sport of rugby union in the county of Hertfordshire in England. The union is the constituent body of the Rugby Football Union (RFU) for Hertfordshire, and administers and organises rugby union clubs and competitions in the county.  It also administers the Hertfordshire county rugby representative teams.

History 

Although the Hertfordshire Rugby Football Union was formed in 1935 and there have been club sides based in the county since as the late 19th century, a senior representative side did not take part in the County Championships until as late as 1952. Two years later after their debut, the county was finally awarded constituent status by the RFU in 1954, allowing them to have a representative on the RFU committee. Over the years Hertfordshire has become an important member of the RFU and is currently one of the stronger sides in the men's County Championships.

Hertfordshire senior men's county side

Hertfordshire senior men's county side currently play in the Bill Beaumont Division 1 South – the top level of the County Championships.  They have reached several finals in the counties history, most recently in 2012 when they finished as winners after beating Lancashire 38–20 at Twickenham. 

Honours:
Bill Beaumont Cup winners: 2012

Affiliated clubs
There are currently 29 clubs affiliated with the Hertfordshire RFU, most of which have teams at both senior and junior level.  The majority of clubs are based in Hertfordshire, but there are also clubs from north-west London.

Barnet Elizabethans
Berkhamsted
Bishop's Stortford
Black Horse
Cheshunt
Chess Valley
Cuffley
Datchworth
Fullerians
Harpenden
Hatfield Queen Elizabeth
Hemel Hempstead
Hertford
Herts Fire & Rescue Service
Hitchin
Letchworth Garden City
Old Albanian
Royston
St Albans
Stevenage Town
Tabard
The Mount
Tring
University of Hertfordshire
Verulamians
Watford
Welwyn
West Herts College
Weston

County club competitions 

The Hertfordshire RFU currently runs the following competitions for club sides based in Hertfordshire and occasionally, north-west London:

Leagues

Herts/Middlesex 1 (alongside Middlesex RFU) – league ranked at tier 9 of the English rugby union system for club sides based in Hertfordshire and the historic county of Middlesex (now London)
Herts/Middlesex 2 – tier 10 league

Cups

Hertfordshire presidents' Cup – founded in 1970, for club sides at tier 6 of the English rugby union system as well as 2nd teams for local clubs in higher divisions (tiers 3–5)
Hertfordshire presidents' Tankard – founded in 2010, for clubs at tiers 7–8
Hertfordshire presidents' Trophy – founded in 1999, for clubs at tiers 9–10

Discontinued competitions

Herts/Middlesex 3 - tier 11 league, discontinued in 2014 
Herts/Middlesex 4 - tier 12 league, discontinued in 2010
Herts/Middlesex 5 - tier 13 league, discontinued in 1997
Hertfordshire 1 - tier 8-10 league, discontinued in 1996
Hertfordshire 2 - tier 9 league, discontinued in 1990

See also
London & SE Division
English rugby union system

References

External links 
Hertfordshire RFU website

Rugby union governing bodies in England
1935 establishments in England
Rugby union in Hertfordshire